Florian Richard Wirtz (born 3 May 2003) is a German professional footballer who plays as an attacking midfielder for Bundesliga club Bayer Leverkusen and the Germany national team.

Club career

Early career
Regarded as a big upcoming talent in German football, Wirtz joined the youth team of 1. FC Köln in 2010, where he remained until he was signed by Bayer Leverkusen in January 2020.

Bayer Leverkusen
After impressing for the under-17 team, Wirtz made his senior professional debut for Leverkusen in the Bundesliga on 18 May, starting in an away match against Werder Bremen. In doing so, he overtook Kai Havertz as Leverkusen's youngest player in the league, at the age of 17 years and 15 days. On 6 June, Wirtz scored his first goal for Leverkusen in the 89th minute of their 4–2 home loss against Bayern Munich, making Wirtz the youngest goalscorer in Bundesliga history at the age of 17 years and 34 days. This record would later be surpassed by Youssoufa Moukoko less than a year later, aged 16 years and 28 days.

Wirtz signed a contract extension with the club on 23 December 2020, extending his deal until 2023. On 19 January 2021, he scored the winner in the 80th minute of Leverkusen's 2–1 home victory over Borussia Dortmund. Wirtz scored his fifth career Bundesliga goal in a 5–2 win against VfB Stuttgart on 6 February, becoming the first player in league history to reach this benchmark before turning eighteen years old. He extended his contract until 2026 on 3 May 2021, the day of his 18th birthday. On 28 November 2021, Wirtz netted his fifth Bundesliga goal of the season in a 1–3 win against RB Leipzig to become the first player under the age of 19 to score more than ten Bundesliga goals. On 15 December, he became the youngest player to reach 50 Bundesliga appearances against Hoffenheim, at the age of 18 years and 223 days.

On 13 March 2022, he tore his anterior cruciate ligament in a 1–0 defeat against 1. FC Köln, hence he missed the rest of the 2021–22 Bundesliga season.

International career
Wirtz received his first call up to the senior team for 2022 FIFA World Cup qualifiers in March 2021. He made his debut on 2 September in a World Cup qualifier against Liechtenstein, a 2–0 away victory. He substituted Joshua Kimmich in the 82nd minute.

Playing style
Wirtz is an attacking midfielder, although he can also play wide on the left as an inverted winger. He has a marked offensive mindset and is a very dynamic midfielder, who covers a lot of ground.

Personal life
Wirtz was born in the Brauweiler district of Pulheim, North Rhine-Westphalia. 

Wirtz's parents are his agents; his father, Hans-Joachim, is also the chairman of Grün-Weiß Brauweiler, the club that Wirtz played for as a child before joining Köln. His elder sister Juliane is a professional footballer as well; she made her Women's Bundesliga debut at the age of sixteen and represented Germany at youth level.

Career statistics

Club

International

Honours

International

Germany U21
UEFA European Under-21 Championship: 2021

Individual
Fritz Walter Medal U19 Gold: 2022
Fritz Walter Medal U17 Gold: 2020
Bundesliga Player of the Month: September 2021
Bundesliga Team of the Season: 2021–22
VDV Bundesliga Newcomer of the Season: 2021–22
VDV Bundesliga Team of the Season: 2021–22

References

External links
 
 
 
 

2003 births
Living people
People from Pulheim
Sportspeople from Cologne (region)
Footballers from North Rhine-Westphalia
German footballers
Germany youth international footballers
Germany under-21 international footballers
Germany international footballers
Association football midfielders
Bayer 04 Leverkusen players
Bundesliga players